The Seefelder Spitze is a mountain east of Seefeld in Tirol in the Karwendel Alps in the Austrian state of Tyrol. It is 2,221 metres high and there is a summit cross at the top.

Ascent 
There is an easy waymarked route approaching from the Rosshütte to the northwest. The path runs climbs initially eastwards to the Seefelder Joch and then turns south along the ridgeline on the Panorama Höhenweg to the summit. This ridgeline has metal railings for protection in one or two places but is straightforward provided care is taken, especially when busy. The Rosshütte is at the top of a funicular from Seefeld and is connected to the Seefelder Joch by a cable car. Another, more difficult approach is from the more exposed ridgeline to the south from the direction of the Reither Spitze, and there are also unmarked tracks up the west flank.

References 

Mountains of Tyrol (state)
Two-thousanders of Austria
Mountains of the Alps